Biryuch is a rural locality (a settlement) in Krasnogvardeysky District, Belgorod Oblast, Russia. The population was 303 as of 2010. There are 5 streets.

Geography 
Biryuch is located 13 km southwest of Biryuch (the district's administrative centre) by road. Valuy is the nearest rural locality.

References 

Rural localities in Krasnogvardeysky District, Belgorod Oblast